Fragile, released on 7 July 2014, is the sixth solo album by former Ultravox frontman Midge Ure.

Background

Ure produced and recorded the album at his home. It was his first solo album with original material since Move Me (2000). All tracks are written by Ure, except "Let It Rise" which was co-written with the German artist/composer Schiller. "Let It Rise" is a reworked version from the earlier Schiller-version from the album Atemlos released 2010. The other track is “Dark Dark Night,” which is a collaboration with Moby.

Though he never completely stopped working on his music during the intervening years, Ure had been questioning whether he wanted to be part of the radically changed industry. Reuniting with Ultravox inspired him to focus on music again, and ultimately finish the material that would become ‘Fragile.’

The title track on the album, "Fragile" is a firsthand look at how an alcoholic thinks. Ure had gotten sober after spending the previous 12 years or so dealing with alcoholism when he wrote the song. Ure said: "We all have a breaking point, and my breaking point proved that I was as fragile as anyone else."

Ure said 2014 about the album:

Track listing 
All tracks composed by Midge Ure; except where indicated

Personnel 
 Played/Produced/Mixed by Midge Ure
 Programming and Keyboards (Track 7) - Moby
 Drum Samples (Track 1) - Russell Field

References 

2014 albums
Midge Ure albums
Albums produced by Midge Ure